Maor Levi (born 18 June 2000) is an Israeli professional footballer who plays as a midfielder for Maccabi Petah Tikva.

Early life
Levi was born in Nesher, Israel, to a family of Jewish descent.

Honours 
Maccabi Haifa
 Israeli Premier League: 2020–21, 2021–22
 Toto Cup: 2021–22
 Israel Super Cup: 2021

References

External links

2000 births
Living people
Israeli Jews
Israeli footballers
Footballers from Nesher
Maccabi Haifa F.C. players
Maccabi Petah Tikva F.C. players
Israeli Premier League players
Liga Leumit players
Association football midfielders